Joeri Verlinden (born 22 January 1988) is a Dutch swimmer who specializes in butterfly and freestyle. He is currently trained by Martin Truijens. He was previously trained by Marcel Wouda.

Swimming career
Verlinden made his international debut at the European Short Course Swimming Championships 2006 in Helsinki where he started in all butterfly events finishing 34th in the 50 m, 32nd in the 100 m and 27th in the 200 m butterfly. At the 2007 Dutch Open Swim Cup he qualified for the European LC Championships in his hometown Eindhoven.

At the European Championships in March 2008 he ended 16th in the 50 m butterfly and 11th in the 100 m butterfly, he missed out for the 2008 Summer Olympics by 0.23 seconds. In the 200 m butterfly he ended 21st. In April he competed in the 2008 FINA Short Course World Championships and finished ex-aequo 17th in the 50 m butterfly and 16th in the 100 m. In the 4 × 100 m medley relay he swam a national record together with Bastiaan Tamminga, Robin van Aggele and Mitja Zastrow finishing 8th in the final.

Verlinden qualified for the 2016 Summer Olympics in Rio de Janeiro in the 100 meter butterfly.

Personal bests

References

1988 births
Living people
Dutch male butterfly swimmers
Dutch male freestyle swimmers
Male medley swimmers
Olympic swimmers of the Netherlands
People from Roerdalen
Swimmers at the 2012 Summer Olympics
Swimmers at the 2016 Summer Olympics
European Aquatics Championships medalists in swimming
Sportspeople from Limburg (Netherlands)